Florence Nambozo Wamala  (born 14 February 1975)  is a Ugandan politician and member of the parliament. She was elected as a woman Member of Parliament to represent Sironko district in 2016 Uganda general elections  and was re-elected for the same post in the 2021 Uganda general elections.

Education 
She completed her primary level education in 1989 at Nkoyoyo Boarding Primary School, Matale, In 1992,Florence completed her Uganda Certificate of Education (UCE) for lower secondary education at Nabumali High School .

She completed her advanced secondary level known as Uganda Advanced Certification of Education (UACE) in 2008 at Makerere Day and Evening Adult School in Kampala. In 2012 she graduated from Kyambogo University with a bachelor's degree of Arts in Education.

Career 
She is Chairperson of  Sironko Development Network, a position she holds since 2014. She taught at Aga Khan Education Services in Uganda from 2002 to 2011 and became a member of parliament in 2016 general elections, a position she acquired again through the 2021 Uganda general elections.

See also 

 Sironko District
 List of members of the eleventh Parliament of Uganda
List of members of the tenth Parliament of Uganda
 Member of Parliament 
 Parliament of Uganda

References

External links 

 Website of the Parliament of Uganda

21st-century Ugandan women politicians
21st-century Ugandan politicians
Living people
1975 births
Women members of the Parliament of Uganda
Members of the Parliament of Uganda
National Resistance Movement politicians
Kyambogo University alumni